The Channel Tunnel Rail Link Act 1996 (c. 61) is an Act of the Parliament of the United Kingdom that made legal provision for the construction, maintenance and operation of the Channel Tunnel Rail Link between St Pancras railway station and the entrance to the Channel Tunnel at Folkestone which is now known as High Speed 1 (HS1) although officially under the legislation it is still the Channel Tunnel Rail Link (CTRL).

External links

theyworkforyou.com - Hansard records of Parliamentary debate relating to the Act

United Kingdom Acts of Parliament 1996
Act 1996
1996 in rail transport